Marguerite Radideau (5 March 1907 – 14 March 1978) was a French sprinter. She competed in 60–250 m events at the 1926 Women's World Games and won two gold, one silver and one bronze medals. In 1924 she competed at the 1924 Women's Olympiad winning the bronze medal in running 100 yards. She participated in the 1928 Olympic Games at Amsterdam, she placed fourth in the 4 x 100 metres relay (alongside Yolande Plancke, Georgette Gagneux and Lucienne Velu). and failed to reach the final of the 100 m event.

References

1907 births
1978 deaths
French female sprinters
Olympic athletes of France
Athletes (track and field) at the 1928 Summer Olympics
Athletes from Paris
Women's World Games medalists
20th-century French women
Olympic female sprinters